Hezar Khani (also Romanized as Hezār Khānī and Hezārkhānī) is a village in Osmanvand Rural District, Firuzabad District, Kermanshah County, Kermanshah Province, Iran. At the 2006 census, its population was 28, in 7 families.

References 

Populated places in Kermanshah County